Belaya Gora (Ürüŋ xaya) is an urban locality (an urban-type settlement) and the administrative center of Abyysky District in the Sakha Republic, Russia, located on the right bank of the Indigirka River, approximately  downstream of its confluence with its tributary the Uyandina, opposite the village of Suturuokha. At the 2010 Census, its population was 2,245.

Etymology
The literal meaning of both the Russian and Sakha language names is the "white mountain".

History
It was granted urban-type settlement status in 1975.

Administrative and municipal status
Within the framework of administrative divisions, Belaya Gora serves as the administrative center of Abyysky District. As an administrative division, the urban-type settlement of Belaya Gora is incorporated within Abyysky District as the Settlement of Belaya Gora. As a municipal division, the Settlement of Belaya Gora is incorporated within Abyysky Municipal District as Belaya Gora Urban Settlement.

Transportation
Belaya Gora is not connected to the outside world by any year-round roads. A winter road following the Indigirka, partially on the ice of the river when frozen, passes through, allowing for travel downstream to Chokurdakh and upstream to Ust-Nera via Khonuu. Another route exists, which leads west from Belaya Gora, up the valley of the Uyadina, to the mining settlement of Deputatsky; however, this route is no longer maintained.

The Belaya Gora Airport is located a short distance to the northeast.

References

Notes

Sources
Official website of the Sakha Republic. Registry of the Administrative-Territorial Divisions of the Sakha Republic. Abyysky District. 

Urban-type settlements in the Sakha Republic
Road-inaccessible communities of the Sakha Republic